Jack's was a British discount supermarket chain based in Welwyn Garden City, Hertfordshire, owned by Tesco.

History

Jack's was founded in 2018 by Tesco as a discount chain to rival stores such as Lidl and Aldi. It is named after the Tesco founder, Jack Cohen. The company opened its first stores in Chatteris, Cambridgeshire, and Immingham, Lincolnshire, on 20 September 2018. Initial plans were to open between ten and fifteen stores within six months of launching; they ultimately only ever operated thirteen stores across the UK. From May 2019, selected products from Jack's stores will be made available in Tesco stores for the first time.

The store's locations at St Helens, Edge Hill, Liverpool, Walton, Rubery, and Castle Bromwich all previously traded as Tesco Metro stores prior to being converted to the Jack's fascia. Middlewich and Rawtenstall stores previously traded as Tesco superstores before being converted to Jack's. Chatteris and Immingham were built as Tesco superstores that never opened, instead they were subdivided with Jack's taking approximately half the space, the rest being let to other retailers. Barnsley was a new build, built specifically as a Jack's store and located in the car park of the town's Tesco superstore. The Jack's store in Wakefield has taken the former lot of Toys"R"Us, but only using a small percentage of the former store space for customer use.

In September 2019, Tesco announced that it was planning to axe its first Jack's store in Rawtenstall, and return the site to a regular Tesco superstore format following customer feedback and research. The company cited demand from the local customers.

In January 2022, it was announced the chain would be shut, with 6 of the 13 stores being rebranded as Tesco stores and the remaining 7 closing. The first stores were closed on 7 March 2022 with the final stores closed on 25 March 2022.

The brand will live on, with a large number of "Jack's, part of the Tesco Family" branded items replacing the Happy Shopper and other own-label brand items sold through Booker Wholesale Cash & Carry warehouses to Budgens, Londis and Premier fascia stores as well as independent corner shops.

References

External links

 Website archive

2018 establishments in England
British brands
British companies established in 2018
Companies based in Welwyn Hatfield
Defunct retail companies of the United Kingdom 
Retail companies established in 2018
Supermarkets of the United Kingdom
Tesco